Mariko Nagai is a Japanese-born poet and writer who writes in English. Although she was born in Japan, she grew up in Belgium, Japan, California, and Tennessee due to her father's job transfers. She received an undergraduate degree from Boston University, and later a graduate degree from New York University.

She is a Professor of creative writing and Japanese literature, and director of research at Temple University, Japan Campus in Tokyo.

Books
Under the Broken Sky, Henry Holt & Co., 2019
Irradiated Cities, Les Figues Press, 2017
Dust of Eden, Albert Whitman & Co, 2014
 Instructions for the Living, Word Temple Press, 2012
 Georgic: Stories, BkMk Press / University of Missouri Kansas City, 2010
 History of Bodies: Poems, Red Hen Press, 2007

Awards
Erich Maria Remarque Fellowship from New York University
Fellowships from the Rockefeller Foundation Bellagio Center and Akademie Schloss Solitude 
UNESCO-Aschberg Bursaries for the Arts
Finalist in the 2010 Leapfrog Press Global Fiction Prize Contest for Weight of the Land 
Pushcart Prize for her poetry and fiction
Benjamin Saltman Prize from Red Hen Press for Histories of Bodies
G.S. Sharat Chandra Fiction Prize (2009) from BkMk Press for Georgic: Stories

References

External links

Maria Nagai - Bio, Age, Wiki, Video, Family & Photos
Mariko Nagai's website
Japan Times article about Mariko Nagai

Living people
Japanese women poets
Japanese women short story writers
New York University alumni
Boston University alumni
Year of birth missing (living people)